Flamiche is a specialty of Picardy (located in northern France), and a puff pastry tart made with leeks and cream. The pastry is made of a brioche-type dough. It resembles a quiche. It is also a speciality of Dinant and of Walloon cuisine, a tart made from a base of low-fat cheese (boulette de Romedenne) butter and eggs, is eaten hot and traditionally  accompanied by Savigny, a Burgundy wine.

References

French cuisine
Picardy cuisine
Belgian cuisine
Dinant
Walloon culture